Austroscolia soror (hairy flower wasp, blue flower wasp, black flower wasp, or blue hairy flower wasp), is a common insect found in Australia. It may grow to 3 cm long. The wings are a smoky black colour with an appealing blue sheen. The wing veins do not reach the end of the wings, and the antennae are relatively thick. Adults feed on nectar. The female lays her eggs on larval beetles.

References

Scoliidae
Hymenoptera of Australia
Insects described in 1855